Age-related maculopathy susceptibility protein 2,  is a mitochondrial protein that in humans is encoded by the ARMS2 gene.

References

External links

Further reading